The play-offs of the UEFA Euro 2016 qualifying tournament decided the final four teams which qualified for the UEFA Euro 2016 final tournament. Eight teams, each of which finished third in their qualifying group were paired and contested in four ties, with the winner of each pair qualifying for the final tournament. Each of the four ties were played over two home-and-away legs with the four winners found according to the standard rules for the knockout phase in European competitions. The matches took place between 12 and 17 November 2015.

Ranking of third-placed teams
The highest ranked third placed team from the groups qualified automatically for the tournament, while the remainder entered the playoffs. As most groups contained six teams but one contained five, matches against the sixth-placed team in each group were not included in this ranking. As a result, a total of eight matches played by each team were counted in the third-placed ranking table.

Seeding
The draw for the play-offs was held on 18 October 2015, 11:20 CEST, at the UEFA headquarters in Nyon. The teams were seeded for the play-off draw according to the UEFA national team coefficient rankings updated after the completion of the qualifying group stage. The four top-ranked teams were seeded and paired with the four unseeded teams. The order of legs of each tie was also decided by draw.

The seedings were as follows:

Summary
The schedule of the play-offs was published by UEFA within one hour of the draw. The eight matches were spread over the six days, with the first legs on 12–14 November and the second legs on 15–17 November. The kickoff times were 18:00 or 20:45 CET (local times are in parentheses).

|}

Matches

Ukraine won 3–1 on aggregate and qualified for UEFA Euro 2016.

Sweden won 4–3 on aggregate and qualified for UEFA Euro 2016.

Republic of Ireland won 3–1 on aggregate and qualified for UEFA Euro 2016.

Hungary won 3–1 on aggregate and qualified for UEFA Euro 2016.

Goalscorers

Discipline 
A player was automatically suspended for the next match for the following offences:
 Receiving a red card (red card suspensions could be extended for serious offences)
 Receiving three yellow cards in three different matches, as well as after fifth and any subsequent yellow card (yellow card suspensions were carried forward to the play-offs, but not the finals or any other future international matches)
The following suspensions were served during the play-off matches:

See also
Denmark–Sweden football rivalry

References

External links
UEFA Euro 2016 qualifying play-offs

Play-offs
Republic of Ireland at UEFA Euro 2016
Sweden at UEFA Euro 2016
Ukraine at UEFA Euro 2016
Hungary at UEFA Euro 2016
2015 in Swedish football
2015–16 in Danish football
2015–16 in Slovenian football
2015–16 in Bosnia and Herzegovina football
Denmark–Sweden football rivalry